Terrine may refer to:

 Terrine (cookware), a vessel for cooking a forcemeat loaf
 Terrine (food), a forcemeat similar to pâté